The Division 2 season 1994/1995, organised by the LFP was won by Olympique de Marseille and saw the promotions of En Avant Guingamp and FC Gueugnon, whereas Stade Briochin, AS Beauvais, CS Sedan Ardennes and Nîmes Olympique were relegated to National.

22 participating teams

 Alès
 Amiens
 Angers
 Beauvais
 Charleville
 Châteauroux
 Dunkerque
 Gueugnon
 Guingamp
 Laval
 Le Mans
 Marseille
 Mulhouse
 Nancy
 Nîmes
 Niort
 Perpignan
 Red Star
 Saint-Brieuc
 Sedan
 Toulouse
 Valence

League table

Recap
 Promoted to L1 : En Avant Guingamp, FC Gueugnon (Olympique de Marseille was not promoted due to financial problems)
 Relegated to L2 : SM Caen, FC Sochaux-Montbéliard
 Promoted to L2 : FC Lorient, Stade Poitevin, SAS Épinal, CS Louhans-Cuiseaux
 Relegated to National : Stade Briochin, AS Beauvais, CS Sedan Ardennes, Nîmes Olympique

Results

Top goalscorers

External links
RSSSF archives of results

Ligue 2 seasons
French
2